Fairy tales have provided a significant source of inspiration for the Disney studio. Sometimes, Walt Disney Pictures alters gruesome fairy tales in order to make them more appropriate for different age groups, specifically children and adults. The silent short cartoons produced at the Laugh-O-Gram Studio during Walt Disney's early career consisted of humorous, modern retellings of traditional stories. Later, Walt Disney and his studio turned to traditional fairy tales as the source for shorts in the Silly Symphony series, and later animated features such as Snow White and the Seven Dwarfs, his first full-length feature. After a hiatus from the fairy tale genre, the modern Disney company once more looked to classic fairy tales during the late 80s and 90s, resulting in popular films such as The Little Mermaid and Beauty and the Beast. The following list is of such fairy tale films produced by the Disney company, along with their sources of inspiration (some stories, including Cinderella and The Ugly Duckling, have been subject to multiple treatments). Excluded are television series (such as The Little Mermaid TV series) and sequels to previous fairy tale films (such as Cinderella II: Dreams Come True), unless explicitly incorporating elements of another traditional story.

Disney's animated shorts based on fairy tales

Disney feature films based on fairy tales

Disney feature films containing segments based on fairy tales 

 
Based on fairy tales
Animated films based on fairy tales
Lists of American animated films
Films based on fairy tales